Paramjit Kaur Gulshan (born 4 January 1949) is a former member of parliament who represented Faridkot and is a member of the Shiromani Akali Dal (Sanyukt). She represented Bathinda in the 14th Lok Sabha.

Early life 
She was born in Akali Jalal, Bathinda district to S. Dhanna Singh Gulshan and Basant Gulshan in 1949, and married Nirmal Singh (who has served as judge of Punjab and Haryana high court and is presently member of legislative assembly, Bassi Pathana, Punjab) in 1978. She graduated with a M.A. from Punjab University and a B.Ed. from Guru Nanak Dev University.

References

External links
 Members of Fourteenth Lok Sabha - Parliament of India website

Living people
1949 births
India MPs 2004–2009
India MPs 2009–2014
People from Bathinda district
Shiromani Akali Dal politicians
Guru Nanak Dev University alumni
Panjab University alumni
Women in Punjab, India politics
Lok Sabha members from Punjab, India
National Democratic Alliance candidates in the 2014 Indian general election
21st-century Indian women politicians
21st-century Indian politicians
People from Faridkot district
Women members of the Lok Sabha